Digao may refer to:

 Zhuanxu, also known as Digao (i.e., Emperor Gao), legendary Chinese ruler
 Emperor Gaozu of Han, or Digao (died  195 BC), a historical Chinese emperor of the early Han dynasty
 Liu Zhiyuan, or Digao (895–948), historical Chinese emperor of the Later Han dynasty
 Digão (footballer, born 1985), full name Rodrigo Manuel Izecson dos Santos Leite, Brazilian footballer, brother of Kaká
 Digão (footballer, born 1986), full name Rodrigo Candido Andrade, Brazilian football left-back
 Digão (footballer, born 1988), full name Rodrigo Junior Paula Silva, Brazilian footballer
 Digão (footballer, born 1993), full name Rodrigo Longo Freitas, Brazilian footballer